Shamshi-Adad (Amorite: Shamshi-Addu), ruled  1808–1776 BC, was an Amorite warlord and conqueror who had conquered lands across much of Syria, Anatolia, and Upper Mesopotamia.

Rise

Shamshi-Adad I inherited the throne in Ekallatum from Ila-kabkabu (fl. c. 1836 BC – c. 1833 BC). Ila-kabkabu is mentioned as the father of Shamshi-Adad I in the "Assyrian King List" (AKL); a similar name (not necessarily the same figure) is listed in the preceding section of the AKL among the “kings whose fathers are known”. However, Shamshi-Adad I did not inherit the Assyrian throne from his father but was instead a conqueror. Ila-kabkabu had been an Amorite king not of Assur (Aššur) (in Assyria) but of Ekallatum. According to the Mari Eponyms Chronicle, Ila-kabkabu seized Shuprum (c. 1790 BC), then Shamshi-Adad I “entered his father's house” (Shamshi-Adad I succeeded Ila-kabkabu as the king of Ekallatum, in the following year.):163 Šamši-Adad I had been forced to flee to Babylon (c. 1823 BC) while Narām-Sîn of Eshnunna (fl. c. 1850 BC – c. 1816 BC) had attacked Ekallatum. Shamshi-Adad I had remained in exile until the death of Naram-Sin of Eshnunna (c. 1816 BC.) The AKL records that Shamshi-Adad I "went away to Babylonia in the time of Naram-Sin". Shamshi-Adad I did not return until retaking Ekallatum, pausing for some time, and then overthrowing King Erishum II of Assur (fl. c. 1818 BC – c. 1809 BC)
Shamshi-Adad I conquered Assur and emerged as the first Amorite king of Assyria (c. 1808 BC)

Although regarded as an Amorite by later Assyrian tradition, earlier archaeologists assumed that Shamshi-Adad I had indeed been a native Assyrian. Usha was the second last in the section "kings who lived in tents" of the AKL, however; Ushpia has not been confirmed by contemporary artifacts. Ushpia is succeeded on the AKL by his son Apiashal. Apiashal was a monarch of the Early Period of Assyria, according to the AKL. Apiashal is listed within the section of the AKL as the last of whom "altogether seventeen kings, tent dwellers". This section shows marked similarities to the ancestors of the First Babylonian dynasty. Apiashal is also listed within a section of the AKL as the first of the ten "kings whose fathers are known". This section (which in contrast to the rest of the list) had been written in reverse order—beginning with Aminu and ending with Apiashal "altogether ten kings who are ancestors"—has often been interpreted as the list of ancestors of Shamshi-Adad I. In keeping with this assumption, scholars have inferred that the original form of the AKL had been written (among other things) as an "attempt to justify that Shamshi-Adad I was a legitimate ruler of the city-state Assur and to obscure his non-Assyrian antecedents by incorporating his ancestors into a native Assyrian genealogy". However, this interpretation has not been accepted universally; the Cambridge Ancient History rejected this interpretation and instead interpreted the section as being that of the ancestors of Sulili.

In the city-state Assur, Shamshi-Adad I held the title "Governor of Assur". Stone tablets with Akkadian inscriptions (formatted in three columns and one hundred and thirty-five lines, from Shamshi-Adad I) have been found near the temple of the god Assur. Many bricks and objects inside the temple have the inscription "Shamshi-Adad I, Builder of the Temple of Assur" carved into them. In this inscription he claimed to have been "King of the Universe" and "Unifier of the Land Between Tigris and Euphrates". He asserted that the king of the Upper Land had paid tribute to him and that he had built the temple of Enlil. He outlined the market prices of that time as being one shekel of silver being worth two kors of barley, fifteen minas of wool, or two seahs of oil.

Conquests
Shamshi-Adad I took over the long-abandoned town of Shekhna (today known as Tell Leilan), converted it into the capital city of the Kingdom of Upper Mesopotamia, and then renamed it Šubat-Enlil (meaning "the residence of the god Enlil" in the Akkadian language) c. 1808 BC.  During his reign, the Kingdom of Upper Mesopotamia competed for power in Lower Mesopotamia against: King Naram-Sin of Eshnunna (who died c. 1816 BC), Naram-Sin's successors, and Yahdun-Lim of Mari. A main target for expansion was the city of Mari, which controlled the caravan route between Anatolia and Mesopotamia. King Yahdun-Lim of Mari (fl. c. 1800 BC – c. 1700 BC) was assassinated by his own servants (possibly on Shamshi-Adad I's orders.) The heir to the throne of Mari, Zimri-Lim, was forced to flee to Yamhad. Shamshi-Adad I seized the opportunity and occupied Mari c. 1796 BC. He placed his sons (Ishme-Dagan I and Yasmah-Adad) in key geographical locations and gave them responsibility to look over those areas. Shamshi-Adad I  put his eldest son (Ishme-Dagan I) on the throne of Ekallatum, while Shamshi-Adad I remained in Šubat-Enlil. Shamshi-Adad I put his second son, Yasmah-Adad, on the throne in Mari. With the annexation of Mari, Shamshi-Adad I had carved out a large empire encompassing much of Syria, Anatolia, and the whole of Upper Mesopotamia (this empire often referred to as either the "Kingdom of Upper Mesopotamia" or the "Upper Mesopotamian Empire".) Shamshi-Adad I proclaimed himself as "King of All" (the title had been used by Sargon of the Akkadian Empire c. 2334 BC – c. 2279 BC).

King Dadusha of Eshnunna (fl. c. 1800 BC – c. 1779 BC), made an alliance with Shamshi-Adad I to conquer the area between the two Zab rivers c. 1781 BC. This military campaign of joint forces was commemorated on a victory stele which states that Dadusha gave the lands to Shamshi-Adad I. Shamshi-Adad I later turned against Dadusha by attacking cities including Shaduppum, Nerebtum and Andarig. On inscriptions Shamshi-Adad I boasts of erecting triumphal stelae on the coast of the Mediterranean, but these probably represent short expeditions rather than any attempts at conquest. His campaigns were meticulously planned, and his army knew all the classic methods of siegecraft, such as encircling ramparts and battering rams. The 5th year name of Dadusha's son and successor, Ibal-pi-el II records the death of Shamshi-Adad.

Family 

While Ishme-Dagan I was probably a competent ruler, his brother Yasmah-Adad appears to have been a man of weak character; something the disappointed father (Shamshi-Adad I) was not above mentioning:

Shamshi-Adad I wrote in another letter:

Shamshi-Adad I clearly kept a firm control on the actions of his sons, as shown in his many letters to them. At one point he arranged a political marriage between Yasmah-Adad to Beltum, the princess of his ally in Qatna. Yasmah-Adad already had a leading wife and had put Beltum in a secondary position of power. Shamshi-Adad I did not approve and forced his son to keep Beltum in the palace in a leading position.

Shamshi-Adad I sent a letter on a tablet to Ishi-Addu (Beltum's father, the King of Qatna) in which he discussed their alliance, the attacks of their enemies, and the successful marriage between their children. In it Shamshi-Adad I wrote:

Reign 
Shamshi-Adad I was a great organizer and he kept firm controls on all matters of state, from high policy down to the appointing of officials and the dispatching of provisions. Spies and propaganda were often used to win over rival cities. He allowed conquered territories to maintain some of their earlier practices. In Nineveh he used state resources to rebuild the Ishtar temple. The local rulers of the city Qattara maintained authority (but became vassals) when they were incorporated into the Kingdom of Upper Mesopotamia. User of these Assyrian Eponym dating system was enforced throughout the Kingdom of Upper Mesopotamia in cities such as: Mari, Tuttul, Terqa, and the capital city Šubat-Enlil.

Fall 

Shamshi-Adad I continued to strengthen his kingdom throughout his life, but as he got older, the state became more vulnerable and the neighboring great powers Yamkhad and Eshnunna began attacking. The empire lacked cohesion and was in a vulnerable geographical position. Naturally, Shamshi-Adad I's rise to glory earned him the envy of neighboring kings and tribes, and throughout his reign, he and his sons
faced several threats to their control. After the death of Shamshi-Adad I, Eshnunna captured cities around Assur. When the news of Shamshi-Adad I's death spread, his old rivals set out to topple his sons from the throne. Yasmah-Adad was soon expelled from Mari by Zimri-Lim (fl. c. 1775 BC – c. 1761 BC), and the rest of the empire was eventually lost during the reigns of Išme-Dagān I and Mut-Ashkur, first to a coalition of Mari, Andarig, and Eshnunna, then to another Amorite ruler, Hammurabi of Babylon (fl. c. 1792 BC – c. 1750 BC)

See also

 Assyrian continuity
 List of Assyrian kings
 Timeline of the Assyrian Empire
 Chronology of the ancient Near East

References

Sources
OBO (Orbis Biblicus et Orientalis) 160/4
 
 
 
 
 
 
 
 
 
 
 
 
 
 P. Villard, "Shamshi-Adad and Sons: The Rise of an Upper Mesopotamian Kingdom", in J. M. Sasson (ed.), Civilizations of the Ancient Near East, vol. II, Scribner, New York, 1995, p. 873-883

19th-century BC Assyrian kings
18th-century BC Assyrian kings
Amorite kings
Year of birth unknown

Year of death unknown
18th-century BC deaths
Kings of the Universe